Donlen Corporation is an American fleet leasing and management company headquartered in Bannockburn, Illinois, a suburb of Chicago. With offices throughout the U.S. and Canada, the company provides consultation, maintenance, and outsourcing for corporate vehicle fleets. Donlen currently has over 165,000 vehicles under lease and management with over 300 employees.

History 
Donlen Corporation was founded in 1965 by Donald Rappeport and Leonard Vine. In September 2011 the company was acquired by Hertz Global Holdings, Inc for $250 million in cash and the assumption of $770 million in Donlen fleet debt. It now forms a subsidiary of the Hertz Corporation. On March 30, 2021, Hertz completed a sale of Donlen Corporation to Athene Holding.

Business overview 
Donlen Corporation is a fleet management provider focusing on the management and consultation of a company's commercial vehicle fleet, including cars, vans, and trucks.  Donlen performs fleet management functions such as vehicle financing, vehicle acquisition, vehicle registration services, and vehicle re-marketing.

Partnerships 
Donlen partnered with the EDF in a strategic alliance to enable commercial and municipal vehicle fleets to monitor and reduce their carbon emissions.  In addition, Donlen partnered with the EPA's SmartWay Program to display Smartway Vehicle Certifications on qualifying vehicles to help drivers and fleet managers choose the best performers.

References

External links 
 
Climbing the mountain: How Gary Rappeport put Donlen Corp. on the ascent by creating a plan to retain top talent
DonlenGreenKey.com
Donlen Announces Release Of Award-Winning FleetWeb 3.0

Transport operations
Companies based in Lake County, Illinois
Leasing companies
2011 mergers and acquisitions
American companies established in 1965
Transport companies established in 1965
Fleet management
Companies that filed for Chapter 11 bankruptcy in 2020